Indus OS is an Indian smartphone application and content discovery platform based on Android, with the aim to brings the users, developers and smartphone brands on a single platform and to create an Indian smartphone ecosystem.

The platform is addressing the low smartphone adoption, content consumption and linguistic challenges of Indian markets. The contextual integration provides India's service & content providers a platform to seamlessly distribute their content & services and engage with India's ever-growing smartphone users.

The company is catering to 10 crore+ users and has partnered with top OEMs like Samsung, Karbonn, Micromax and 9 other Indian OEMS.

The company's app marketplace, Indus App Bazaar is the largest Indian app store. It is powering Samsung's default app store, Galaxy Store since 2019.

About 
Indus OS was founded in 2013 by Rakesh Deshmukh, Akash Dongre and Sudhir B; all three are alumni of the Indian Institute of Technology, Bombay.

Hari Padmanabhan, an IIT Kanpur alumni, industry veteran and serial entrepreneur, is a seed investor in the company. The company is funded by various investors such as "Omidyar Network, JSW Ventures, VenturEast, Samsung Ventures & Affle".

Indus OS has offices in Mumbai, Delhi and Singapore and currently has an 84-member team.

First touch OS 
Indus OS was initially known as "First Touch OS". In May 2015, Micromax Informatics started shipping the latest version (Unite 3) of its Unite series smartphones with Firstouch OS. The operating system was available in English and 10 Indian languages. A key feature of the operating system was the Swipe-to-translate or Indus Swipe which helped users to translate or transliterate English text in regional languages. The operating system also had its own app marketplace' App Bazaar with over 5,000 applications in regional languages.

In December 2015, Firstouch announced a collaboration with the Government of India's Ministry of Electronics and Information Technology previously known as the Department of Electronics and IT (DeitY) to introduce text-to-speech technology in regional languages.

Indus App Bazaar 
The Indus App Bazaar is India's largest Indian app store. It is available 12 Indian languages namely Hindi, Gujarati, Marathi, Tamil, Telugu, Urdu, Odia, Punjabi, Malayalam, Bengali, Assamese and Kannada & English . It has over 4 lakh applications in regional languages. Top publishers on the platform include Truecaller, Amazon, Winzo Games, Blacklight Studio, Sharechat, Junglee Games, Ola, Meesho, MSN, Times Group, Editorji, Inshorts, Rebel Group, Opera News, mpokket, etc.

The product provides various tools to app developers for distribution and promotions along with data insights for targeting and performance analysis. The app store focuses on providing the users with a personalised and localised experience with rich user interface for smooth discovery of apps and content.

Awards and recognition 
 Indus OS collaborated with The Government of India for Aadhar authentication.
 Indus OS also signed an agreement with the Government of India's MeitY (Ministry of Electronics and IT) to introduce Indus Reader, an OS level, offline Text-to-Speech technology in 9 Indian Languages for the first time.
 #1 App Marketing Platform in the Indian Subcontinent - Ranked in the Appsflyer Performance Index Edition IX.
 Winner TiE50 Silicon Valley Top Startup Award.
 Winner NASSCOM Emerge50 – League of Top 10 Startup Award
 Winner Economic Times Telecom Innovation in Developing OEM Product Award
 Winner WCRC Brand of the Year – Technology 
 Indus OS won the 'Digital Startup of the Year Award' at the Drivers of Digital Awards 2016.
 On May 7, 2016, Indus OS was declared the second most popular OS in India according to a research study conducted by Counterpoint Research. As of May 2016, the OS was the second most popular in India, with a 7.6% market share.
 NASSCOM announced Indus OS as one of the top 10 startups in India during the NASSCOM Product Conclave in 2016. 
 The company was also awarded the Aegis Graham Bell Award in the Digital India category alongside Vodafone India for the year 2016. 
 GSMA nominated Indus OS for its annual Global Mobile Awards at the Mobile World Congress, Barcelona 2017 in the category of Best Mobile Innovation for Emerging Markets.
 Indus OS won the Brand of the Year award in the Technology category by World Consulting and Research Corporation in Mumbai on December 21, 2016.
 Mint (newspaper) and MIT Technology Review named Akash Dongre, the Co-Founder & Chief Product Officer at Indus OS as one of the top innovators under the age of 35 from India at the EmTech 2017 event.
 Indus OS has also been named as the SuperBrand's Super Startups which is awarded to the 30+ most innovative business models from India.
 In October 2017, Indus OS was awarded the Confederation of Indian Industry Industrial Innovation Award as one of the Top 10 Startup from India.
 The company's story was also documented as a case study by Ivey Publishing and is also distributed by Harvard Business Review.

Investors 
The major investors include Omidyar Network, JSW Ventures, VenturEast, Samsung Ventures and Affle.

References

External links
 

Mobile operating systems